Tejas Networks is an optical, broadband and data networking products company based in India. The company designs develops and sells its products to telecom service providers, internet service providers, utilities, security and government entities in 75 countries. The company has built many IPs in multiple areas of telecom networking and has emerged as an exporter to other developing countries including Southeast Asia and Africa.

History 
Founded in 2000 by Sanjay Nayak with initial funding from Gururaj Deshpande. They were later joined by Kumar Sivarajan (an academic at Indian Institute of Science, Bangalore and author of a book on optical fiber) along with Arnob Roy (an ex-colleague of Nayak). Tejas Network made a beginning with the development of Intelligent Network technologies. These networks transferred data between two points at the precise speed as per the requirements of the customer. The network also rerouted and cleaned the traffic in case of disruptions During 2002–2003, the company acquired ten customers.

Tejas Networks went public on BSE and NSE in June 2017 with a valuation of Rs 2301 crore.The organization is considered to be the first listed player in the optical networking equipment space in India by Centrum Broking analysts Alpesh Thacker and Siddhartha Khemka. The anchor investors that bet on Tejas Networks ahead of its IPO were namely Abu Dhabi Investment Authority, East Bridge Capital and PremjiInvest, the family investment arm of Wipro Ltd. In 2020, Tejas Network developed the world's largest disaggregated packet-optical switch that was called TJ1600S/I.

ICRA reported a downward shift in their rating because the revenue and profitability of the company experienced a decline in the financial year 2020. The decrease in revenue was accounted to reduced revenue from government and the international market.

On 29 July 2021, Tata Sons, through its subsidiary Panatone Finvest Limited, initiated an investment in Tejas Networks to buy a 43.35% stake for Rs 1884 crore through shares and warrants. According to The Economic Times, Tejas Networks is looking to use Tata group’s backing to expand its telecom products portfolio. In March 2022, Tejas Networks acquired 64% of Saankhya Labs, an Indian wireless communication and semiconductor company. In April 2022, Tata Sons, through Panatone Finvest Limited, increased its shareholding of Tejas Networks to 52.45%, and thus, acquired the majority of Tejas' shares.

Business 
Tejas also has products created on 10G-PON technology, and its equipment are upgradable to 5G. They help private telecom operators in India by supplying GPON equipment. They are partnering with system integrators to bid for BSNL’s 4G tender and investing in 4G wireless. Tejas also supports BSNL’s optical transmission network.

The company is supplying its products to Bharti Airtel for supporting optical network and implementating 5G backhaul, B2B services and broadband applications.

Tejas Networks also supplies GPON equipment to private telecom operators in India.

Tejas' GPON solution has been deployed in BharatNet, it is the world's largest greenfield rural broadband rollout delivering high-speed Internet services to more than 200 million people. Tejas Equipment have helped provide broadband internet to all of India's gram panchayats and has helped connect 40,000 villages so far. Tejas’ broadband products is helping 70% requirement of the BharatNet project.

The company revenue was Rs 526.6 crore in fiscal 2021. Tejas has filed for 349 patents, of which 127 have been granted. They compete with other players in market like Ericsson, Nokia-Siemens, Huawei and Alcatel-Lucent, Ciena, Adva. With the help of PLI Scheme, Tejas is increasing the production to support local demand and reduce $5 billion import bill for the FTTx segment.

References 

2000 establishments in India
Electronics companies established in 2000
Telecommunications companies established in 2000
Telecommunications equipment vendors
VoIP companies